Barasat College, previously named as Barasat Evening College, was established in 1972, is the general degree college in Barasat, Kolkata. It offers undergraduate courses in arts, commerce and sciences.  It is affiliated to West Bengal State University.

Departments

Science

Chemistry
 Geography
Physics
Mathematics
Botany
Zoology
Computer Science

Arts

Bengali
English
History
Political Science
Philosophy
Economics
Education
Sociology
Commerce

Commerce
 Accountancy
 Marketing

Accreditation
Barasat College is recognized by the University Grants Commission (UGC). The college has been accredited B grade by  NAAC.

Controversy
The college has been in news often for various chaos occurred in the college.

See also
Education in India
List of colleges in West Bengal
Education in West Bengal

References

External links
Barasat College

Universities and colleges in North 24 Parganas district
Colleges affiliated to West Bengal State University
Barasat
Educational institutions established in 1972
1972 establishments in West Bengal